Marpesia harmonia, the pale daggerwing or Harmonia daggerwing, is a butterfly of the family Nymphalidae. It is found in south-eastern Mexico and Guatemala.

References 

Cyrestinae
Butterflies described in 1836
Taxa named by Johann Christoph Friedrich Klug